The Summer Sixteen Tour was a co-headlining concert tour by Canadian rapper Drake, and American rapper Future. It began on July 20, 2016 in Austin, and concluded with its final show in Toronto, Ontario on October 8, 2016. Scheduled for 60 performances across North America, the tour was produced by Apple Music in conjunction with Drake's fourth studio album, Views, Future's fourth studio album Evol, as well as their collaborative mixtape What a Time to Be Alive. Guest appearances included Rihanna, Fat Joe, 2 Chainz, Ty Dolla $ign, Young Thug, Kanye West, and more. The tour had a total gross of $84.3 million off 54 shows, making it the highest-grossing hip-hop tour of all time, until he broke this record with his own co-headlining Aubrey & the Three Migos Tour in 2018.

Background
Drake and Future first collaborated in 2012 on "Tony Montana". In 2015 the duo had a single called "Where Ya At", a song later to be used on Future's third studio album, DS2. Since then, other notable collaborations between the pair include Drake's song, "Grammys" featuring Future, and 2015's "Jumpman". The duo also worked on a collaborative mixtape entitled What a Time to Be Alive, which was released on September 20, 2015. Throughout 2013 and 2014, during Drake's Would You Like a Tour?, Future made multiple guest appearances, often appearing to perform alongside to Drake, or serve as the opening act of the show. Rumours of a co-headlining tour from Drake and Future first circulated following the release of What a Time to Be Alive, leading Drake to post on Twitter that he was planning to embark on a tour with Future in the summer.

On April 25, 2016, the Summer Sixteen tour was announced with Future serving as the co-headlining act. Later on the same day, several dates were added on Drake's website, with dvsn and Roy Woods all set to perform as opening acts.

Set list
This set list is representative of the show on July 20, 2016 in Austin. It is not representative of all concerts for the duration of the tour.

"Summer Sixteen"
"Still Here"
"Started from the Bottom"
"9"
""U With Me?"
"Feel No Ways"
"Headlines"
"Trophies"
"HYFR (Hell Ya Fucking Right)"
"0 to 100 / The Catch Up" / "6 God" / "Worst Behavior" / "We Made It" / "Blessings" / "All Me" / "No Lie" / "Versace"/ "Pop That" / "Over" / "I'm on One" / "Up All Night" / "Miss Me" / "Crew Love" 
"With You"
"Child’s Play"
"Fire and Desire"
"Come and See Me"
"Faithful" (with dvsn)
"Hotline Bling"
"Hold On, We're Going Home"
"The Motto"
"Right Hand"
"For Free"
"My Way" (Fetty Wap cover)
"Grammys"
"Scholarships"
"Love Me"
"I'm the Plug"
"Big Rings"
"Jumpman"
"Diamonds Dancing"
"Work"
"Take Care" / "Too Good" (verses)
"Controlla"
"One Dance"
"Back to Back"
"Pop Style"
"Hype"
"Know Yourself"
"Energy"
"Legend"

Tour dates

Cancelled shows

References

External links 

2016 concert tours
Co-headlining concert tours
Drake (musician) concert tours